St Thomas' School is a co-educational kindergarten to higher secondary school in Kidderpore, Kolkata, West Bengal, India. It was established in 1789, making it one of the oldest schools in India and has the largest campus in Kolkata.

It has three football size fields, two basketball courts and children's playgrounds. The campus also houses the St. Thomas' College of Engineering and Technology and has a church known as St. Stephen's Church. There are two schools and an engineering college and a non-formal technical training centre. St. Thomas' boys' and girls' schools are the two schools here.

The school is affiliated to the Council for the Indian School Certificate Examinations (ISC), which conducts the ICSE (Grade 10) and ISC (Grade 12) examinations over the country.

References

External links 
 

High schools and secondary schools in Kolkata
Primary schools in West Bengal
Boarding schools in West Bengal
Christian schools in West Bengal
Schools in Colonial India
Educational institutions established in 1789
1789 establishments in British India